German submarine U-597 was a Type VIIC U-boat of Nazi Germany's Kriegsmarine during World War II.

She was a member of eight wolfpacks, carried out two patrols but sank no ships.

She was sunk southwest of Iceland by a British aircraft on 12 October 1942.

Design
German Type VIIC submarines were preceded by the shorter Type VIIB submarines. U-597 had a displacement of  when at the surface and  while submerged. She had two shafts and two  propellers.

U-597 was fitted with five  torpedo tubes (four fitted at the bow and one at the stern), fourteen torpedoes, one  SK C/35 naval gun, 220 rounds, and a  C/30 anti-aircraft gun. The boat had a complement of between forty-four and sixty.

Service history
The submarine was laid down on 13 January 1941 at Blohm & Voss, Hamburg as yard number 573, launched on 1 October and commissioned on 20 November under the command of Kapitänleutnant Eberhard Bopst.

She served with the 8th U-boat Flotilla from 20 November 1941 for training and the 1st flotilla from 1 July 1942 for operations.

First patrol
U-597 departed Kiel on 27 June 1942 and headed for the Atlantic Ocean. Her route took her through the gap between Iceland and the Faroe Islands toward Newfoundland

She arrived in Brest in occupied France on 16 August.

Second patrol and loss
She departed Brest on 16 September and was sunk less than a month later on 12 October by depth charges dropped by a British B-24 Liberator of No. 120 Squadron RAF piloted by Squadron Leader Terry Bulloch.

Forty-nine men died in U-597; there were no survivors.

Wolfpacks
U-597 took part in eight wolfpacks, namely:
 Wolf (13 – 30 July 1942) 
 Pirat (30 July – 3 August 1942) 
 Steinbrinck (3 – 11 August 1942) 
 Blitz (22 – 26 September 1942) 
 Tiger (26 – 30 September 1942) 
 Luchs (1 – 6 October 1942) 
 Panther (6 – 12 October 1942) 
 Leopard (12 October 1942)

References

Bibliography

External links

German Type VIIC submarines
U-boats commissioned in 1941
U-boats sunk in 1942
U-boats sunk by depth charges
U-boats sunk by British aircraft
World War II submarines of Germany
World War II shipwrecks in the Atlantic Ocean
1941 ships
Ships built in Hamburg
Ships lost with all hands
Maritime incidents in October 1942